Mark Alexander Fraser (born September 29, 1986) is a Canadian professional ice hockey defenceman for the Schwenninger Wild Wings of the Deutsche Eishockey Liga (DEL). He has previously played for the New Jersey Devils, Toronto Maple Leafs and Edmonton Oilers in the National Hockey League (NHL).

Playing career
Fraser played junior hockey with the Kitchener Rangers of the Ontario Hockey League from 2004–06. In his second season with the Rangers, his hard working style earned him the captaincy after Mike Richards left the team. He was selected by the New Jersey Devils in the third round, 84th overall, of the 2005 NHL Entry Draft. At the end of the 2005–06 season, he played his first professional games, joining the AHL Albany River Rats for four games. He played his first full professional season in 2006–07 with the Lowell Devils, and he played seven games for the New Jersey Devils as well. He remained with Lowell until 2009–10, when he made the New Jersey roster out of training camp.

He scored his first NHL goal on October 24, 2009, against Marc-André Fleury of the Pittsburgh Penguins.

On December 12, 2011, Fraser, along with Rod Pelley and a 2012 seventh round draft pick, was traded to the Anaheim Ducks in exchange for Kurtis Foster and Timo Pielmeier. On February 27, 2012, Fraser was traded from the Anaheim Ducks to the Toronto Maple Leafs for Dale Mitchell.

On July 30, 2013, Fraser and the Toronto Maple Leafs avoided salary arbitration and agreed to a one-year contract worth $1.275 million. In the following 2013–14 season, Fraser was unable to match his performance from the lockout season and on January 31, 2014, he was traded by the Leafs to the Edmonton Oilers in exchange for the rights to Teemu Hartikainen and Cam Abney.

A free agent into the 2014–15 season, Fraser made a return of sort to the New Jersey Devils organization in signing a one-year AHL contract with affiliate, the Albany Devils on November 2, 2014. He was later signed for the remainder of the season on a NHL contract with the Devils on December 18, 2014. Fraser's return was complete on January 3, 2015 when he played with New Jersey Devils against Philadelphia Flyers.

Fraser was not tendered an offer by the Devils and was released to free agency. Left without a contract by September, he would make a return to the Leafs, signing a professional try-out. He would ultimately be released without a deal.

On September 28, 2015, the Ottawa Senators signed Fraser to a one-year, two-way contract. After one year playing for the team's AHL affiliate, the Binghamton Senators, he left as a free agent and returned to the Edmonton Oilers on a one-year, two-way deal on July 1, 2016.

As an un-signed free agent leading into the 2017–18 season, Fraser opted to pursue a career abroad, agreeing to an initial try-out offer with Finnish outfit HC TPS of the Liiga on November 16, 2017.

After a second season abroad in the Slovak Extraliga with HKm Zvolen, Fraser signed a one-year contract for the 2019-20 season with German outfit, Schwenninger Wild Wings of the DEL on May 6, 2019.

Personal 
Fraser is the son of former sprinter and Ontario Court of Justice Judge, Hugh Fraser, and retired teacher Ann Kennedy.

After his playing career came to a close, Fraser was hired by the Toronto Maple Leafs and Maple Leaf Sports & Entertainment in February of 2021 "for a role focused on player development with its Equity, Diversity and Inclusion team."

Career statistics

References

External links

1986 births
Living people
Albany Devils players
Albany River Rats players
Bakersfield Condors players
Black Canadian ice hockey players
Binghamton Senators players
Canadian ice hockey defencemen
Canadian sportspeople of Jamaican descent
Edmonton Oilers players
Ice hockey people from Ottawa
Kitchener Rangers players
Lowell Devils players
New Jersey Devils draft picks
New Jersey Devils players
Syracuse Crunch players
HC TPS players
Toronto Maple Leafs players
Toronto Marlies players
HKM Zvolen players
Canadian expatriate ice hockey players in the United States
Canadian expatriate ice hockey players in Slovakia
Canadian expatriate ice hockey players in Germany
Canadian expatriate ice hockey players in Finland